Qatar competed at the 2017 Asian Indoor and Martial Arts Games in Ashgabat, Turkmenistan from September 17 to 27. Qatar won 11 medals during the multi-sport event including 4 gold medals. Qatari delegation claimed 6 medals in 6 different team events.

3x3 Basketball 

Qatar men's national 3x3 basketball team secured the gold medal after emerging as the champions in the men's category by beating Iraq with a score of 22–12 in the finals. Qatari basketball team emerged as unbeaten winners in the tournament.

Participants

Medallists

References 

Nations at the 2017 Asian Indoor and Martial Arts Games
2017 in Qatari sport